The 1913 Canton Professionals season was their fifth season in the Ohio League. The team finished with a record of 4-2-2.

Schedule

Game notes

References

Canton Bulldogs seasons
Canton Bulldogs
Canton Bulldogs